List of the National Register of Historic Places listings in Essex County, New York.

This is intended to be a complete list of properties and districts listed on the National Register of Historic Places in Essex County, New York, United States.  The locations of National Register properties and districts (at least for all showing latitude and longitude coordinates below) can be seen in a map by clicking on "Map of all coordinates".  Seven of the properties and districts are further designated National Historic Landmarks and are indicated by light blue color in the table below.



Current listings

|}

Former listing

|}

See also

 Cure Cottages of Saranac Lake
 National Register of Historic Places listings in New York

References

Essex County